Stitchwort is the common name of several plants of the following genera:

 Minuartia
 Stellaria

See also

 Wort plants